Illinois Bail Amendment may refer to:

 Illinois Bail Amendment (1982)
 Illinois Bail Amendment (1986)